The Don Andrés Hernández Residence (Spanish: Residencia Don Andrés Hernández), also known as the Don Modesto Hernández Residence (Residencia Don Modesto Hernández) or just the Yellow House (La Casa Amarilla), is a historic house located in Dorado Pueblo (downtown Dorado) in the municipality of the same name in northern Puerto Rico. It was added to the National Register of Historic Places on May 22, 1989. Investigation and oral tradition show that this might very well be the second-oldest house in all of Dorado. The sunken level of property, with regards to the current level of the town, testifies as to the old age of the house.

References 

Houses on the National Register of Historic Places in Puerto Rico
1880 establishments in Puerto Rico
Houses completed in 1880
National Register of Historic Places in Dorado, Puerto Rico